Snoopy's Street Fair is a freemium city-building video game developed by Beeline Interactive and published by Capcom for iOS and Android devices, first released in November 2011. Based on the Peanuts comics and TV-series by Charles M. Schulz, the game sees the player as Charlie Brown, who starts a street fair to earn money for uniforms for a baseball game in New York City.

Snoopy's Street Fair received "mixed or average" reviews from critics, having a Metascore of 71/100 on review aggregator Metacritic. Critics praised the game's nostalgia factor for fans of the Peanuts comic strips, but were more negative towards how it becomes necessary to grind for in-game currency, which some critics felt encouraged micropayments. In July 2012, the game was announced to have been downloaded over 5 million times on iOS devices.

Plot 
While outside, Charlie Brown receives a call from Peppermint Patty via a phone booth, who informs Charlie Brown that he and his baseball team have been selected to participate in a Little League Championships in New York City. After realizing that he and his team doesn't have enough money to afford uniforms, Charlie Brown starts a street fair to raise money, where he enlists the help of other Peanuts characters. Sporadically throughout the rest of the game, Peppermint Patty will call Charlie Brown and suggest ways to improve the street fair.

Gameplay 

Snoopy's Street Fair is a city-building game where the player plays Charlie Brown, who starts and builds a street fair. Using in-game currency, players must purchase stands and stalls, which are operated by different Peanuts characters. The game has two different currencies: coins and Snoopy Bucks. Coins can be earned from the different stands and stalls, while Snoopy Bucks are primarily acquired through microtransactions, although they can also be acquired through other means, such as by leveling up. Players also have a to-do list, which includes various optional missions that reward the player with in-game currency and experience points when completed.

Some stalls unlock additional minigames when purchased, such as the photo booth, which allows players to take pictures with Peanuts characters using augmented reality. Players can also collect Snoopy trading cards, which may be dropped from stalls. In addition to the unlockable cards, players can also receive digital Peanuts comic strips to read within the app.

Development and release 
Snoopy's Street Fair was developed by Beeline Interactive, a subsidiary of Capcom, and continued their style of releasing licensed mobile games. Capcom published the game. According to The Guardian, Snoopy's Street Fair was developed to be less controversial than Beeline's prior city-building game, Smurfs' Village. The game featured archived compositions by Vince Guaraldi.

Snoopy's Street Fair was first announced by Beeline in September 2011 and was set to release later in November. The game released in Canada on iOS devices on November 3, and later released worldwide on both iOS and Android devices on November 16. Later, at an unknown time, Snoopy's Street Fair was removed from the App Store.

Reception 

Snoopy's Street Fair received "mixed or average" reviews from critics, according to review aggregator Metacritic. The aggregator calculated an average review score of 71/100, which was based on 7 reviews. Critics praised how Snoopy's Street Fair could be nostalgic for fans of the Peanuts comic strips and TV-series. Critics were more negative towards how the game requires grinding, which was stated to encourage micropayments; Chris Morris of Common Sense Media stated that the game has "ponzi scheme-like marketing" and felt that players were "nickel-and-dimed" throughout the game.

Critics praised the core gameplay of Snoopy's Street Fair for being addictive, albeit repetitive. The game's minigames received mixed reception; Gamezebo called them "plenty of fun", while Pocket Gamer criticized their simplicity.

Critics praised how Snoopy's Street Fair was similar to the original Peanuts comics and TV-series; both Pocket Gamer and Gamezebo praised the game's archived compositions by Vince Guaraldi, in addition to the game's voice acting and art style. Critics were more negative towards the game's emphasis on grinding and microtransactions; GamesMaster UK stated that in-app purchases would "improve [the game] tenfold" and AppSpy Andrew Nesvadba noted the game's grinding as one of its two worst aspects.

Critics drew a comparison between Snoopy's Street Fair and Beeline's priorly released Smurfs' Village, which was also a city-building game. Gamezebo felt that Snoopy's Street Fair was an improvement from Smurfs' Village, writing: "Move over, Smurfs' Village – there's a new comic strip classic in town". Some editors for Common Sense Media also compared Snoopy's Street Fair to SimCity.

Notes

References

External links 
 
 

2011 video games
iOS games
Android (operating system) games
City-building games
Single-player video games
Video games developed in the United Kingdom
Video games based on Peanuts